Fraktur is a specific style of blackletter typeface.

Fraktur may also refer to:

Fraktur (folk art), a kind of Pennsylvania German folk art
Fraktur, a 2009 short film by Hans Steinbichler
Fraktur, a minor Marvel Comics character appearing as a member of the fictitious Nova Corps

See also 
Fracture (disambiguation)